Mritunjay Tripathi (born 13 December 1981) is an Indian cricketer. He played thirteen first-class and eleven List A matches between 1999 and 2004. He was also part of India's squad for the 2000 Under-19 Cricket World Cup.

References

External links
 

1981 births
Living people
Indian cricketers
Uttar Pradesh cricketers
Cricketers from Varanasi